The Anglican Diocese of Masvingo is the fifth and newest diocese in Zimbabwe within the Church of the Province of Central Africa: the current bishop is Godfrey Tawonezvi.

References

Anglicanism in Zimbabwe
Religious organizations established in 2001
Masvingo